Benthobia tornatilis is a species of sea snail, a marine gastropod mollusc in the family Benthobiidae.

Description

Distribution
This marine species occurs on the Lord Howe Rise in the Coral Sea.

References

 Simone, L. R., 2003. Revision of the genus Benthobia (Caenogastropoda, Pseudolividae). Journal of Molluscan Studies 69: 245–162

Benthobiidae
Gastropods described in 2003